Old Union is an unincorporated community in Bowie County, in the U.S. state of Texas. According to the Handbook of Texas, the community had a population of 238 in 2000. It is located within the Texarkana metropolitan area.

History
The area in what is now known as Old Union today was said to have first been settled sometime before 1830. Its name, Union, was derived from a local Union Church. The plot of land on which the community stands is on the land grant of Martin A. Poer, who received it on May 15, 1848. Social activities centered mostly on church functions in the community. Its cemetery was established in the 1860s and the first graves were put there during that time. The early part of the 20th century saw two Baptist churches, several businesses, and several farms and homes. The cemetery remained in use throughout the decade and had a population of 238 from 1990 through 2000.

Geography

Education
A log schoolhouse was used for educational services in the community as early as 1830. It also held church services and school functions. It continued to operate during the early 20th century. Today, Old Union is served by the Simms Independent School District.

References

Unincorporated communities in Bowie County, Texas
Unincorporated communities in Texas